Stuart Bowman (born 13 February 1975 in London) is a British slalom canoeist who competed from the late 1990s to the mid-2000s.

Competing in two Summer Olympics, he earned his best finish of fourth in the C2 event in Sydney in 2000.

His partner in the C2 boat throughout the whole of his career was Nick Smith.

World Cup individual podiums

References

1975 births
English male canoeists
Canoeists at the 2000 Summer Olympics
Canoeists at the 2004 Summer Olympics
Living people
Olympic canoeists of Great Britain
Sportspeople from London
British male canoeists